This is a list of Gaelic football managers. It includes managers currently managing a county team at the top level in the League and Championship, in order of the date of their appointment.

League and Championship managers at top level
The following table shows the current managers, listed by date of appointment.

Recent departures
These are outdated and moved from the table above.

Notable club managers
The following is a list of notable club managers.

References